Hindmarch is a surname. Notable people with the surname include:

Anya Hindmarch (born 1968), British fashion accessories designer
Bob Hindmarch (born 1930), Canadian professor and ice hockey coach
Dave Hindmarch (born 1958), Canadian former professional ice hockey player
Paul Hindmarch (born 1988), English cricketer
Rob Hindmarch (1961–2002), English footballer
Stephen Hindmarch (born 1989), English footballer